The Qʼanjobalan a.k.a. Kanjobalan–Chujean languages are a branch of the Mayan family of Guatemala.

Languages
Qʼanjobʼal (Kanjobalan) proper
Kanjobal–Jacaltec: Akatek, Jakaltek (Poptiʼ), Qʼanjobʼal
Mochoʼ
Chujean: Chuj, Tojolabal

See

References

Mayan languages
Languages of Guatemala